Michael Morley is an Australian Paralympic athlete. At the 1984 New York/Stoke Mandeville Games, he won a gold medal in the Men's High Jump A6 event and a bronze medal in the Men's Triple Jump A6 event.

References

Paralympic athletes of Australia
Athletes (track and field) at the 1984 Summer Paralympics
Medalists at the 1984 Summer Paralympics
Paralympic gold medalists for Australia
Paralympic bronze medalists for Australia
Paralympic medalists in athletics (track and field)
Year of birth missing (living people)
Living people
Australian male high jumpers
Australian male triple jumpers
High jumpers with limb difference
Triple jumpers with limb difference
Paralympic high jumpers
Paralympic triple jumpers